Lennys Grill & Subs®, formerly Lenny's Sub Shop®, is a quick serve sandwich franchise of Philadelphia-style sub shops focused on cheesesteaks and sub sandwiches. Lennys is based in Memphis, Tennessee, and has about 100 locations, mainly throughout the southeastern United States.

Len and Shelia Moore opened the first Lenny's Sub Shop on September 16, 1998, in Bartlett, Tennessee. Within a year, they had expanded to five locations. Franchising began in 2001.

References

External links

Submarine sandwich restaurants
Fast-food chains of the United States
Restaurants established in 1998
Companies based in Memphis, Tennessee
Bartlett, Tennessee
1998 establishments in Tennessee

simple:Cousins Subs